Juan Gabriel Dúos & Interpretaciones is a compilation album released by Juan Gabriel on March 25, 2016. The album features many artists performing Juan Gabriel's songs and duets with him.

Track listing

Charts

Weekly charts

Year-end charts

References

Juan Gabriel compilation albums
2016 compilation albums
Sony Music Latin compilation albums
Spanish-language compilation albums